Irwin Heilner (b. New York City, May 14, 1908; d. January 18, 1991) was an American composer of contemporary classical music. His works are published by American Composers Alliance.

Heilner lived in Brooklyn, New York. In 1932 he was a member of the Young Composers' Group, which was founded by the composer Elie Siegmeister and which met regularly at the home of the composer Aaron Copland. Heilner studied with Nadia Boulanger beginning in the late spring of 1932, having been recommended by Aaron Copland. The two did not get along, however, and his planned three years of study lasted for just three months. His music was conducted and recorded by William Strickland.

External links
List of works from American Composers Alliance site

American male classical composers
American classical composers
1908 births
1991 deaths
20th-century classical composers
20th-century American composers
20th-century American male musicians